The following elections occurred in the year 1807.

North America

United States
 1807 New York gubernatorial election
 United States Senate election in New York, 1807

Europe

United Kingdom
 1807 United Kingdom general election
 1807 Yorkshire election

See also
 :Category:1807 elections

1807
Elections